Matrimonio a Parigi (internationally released as Wedding in Paris) is a 2011 Italian comedy film directed by Claudio Risi and starring Massimo Boldi.

Cast
Massimo Boldi: Lorenzo
Annamaria Barbera: Costanza
Biagio Izzo: Gennaro
Massimo Ceccherini: Leonardo
Enzo Salvi: Annibale
Rocco Siffredi: François
Diana Del Bufalo: Natalina
Paola Minaccioni: Elvira
Emanuele Bosi: Mirko
Raffaella Fico: Beatrice
Guglielmo Scilla: Diego

Plot
A businessman in Italy, who sells his products directly on a television channel without paying any taxes, and a financier, dutiful and always on the hunt for tax evaders, come into contact because their sons, both artists, share an apartment in Paris. Graduation Day is  'the excuse for a trip to the French capital where  destinies, lives and loves of the two families cross.

External links 
 
 MyMovies

Films set in Paris
Italian comedy films
2011 comedy films
2011 films
2010s Italian films
2010s Italian-language films